Gordon (or, in Inupiaq, Pattaktuq, meaning “he/she/it is spanking”, alluding to the pounding of the waves on the shore, as though it is being spanked by someone; also Demarcation) was a former fur trading post in North Slope Borough, Alaska, United States on the shore of Demarcation Bay, near the Canadian border in the east. It was one of the many trading outposts established along the north coast of Alaska in the early 20th century.

History
The place was named after Thomas Gordon, a Scottish whaler and trader who was sent by Charles Brower 
to Demarcation Point in 1917 to establish the post for the fur trading company H.B. Liebes Company of San Francisco. He founded the settlement with the help of Andrew Akootchook, his brother-in-law, and moved there with his wife and their families. After Gordon and his wife's family later moved to Barter Island, his son Mickey took over the trading post and continued to run it until the late 1920s.

The construction of the DEW line in the 1950s affected the appearance of the site. Excessive removal of gravel caused the spit at Demarcation Point, which used to extend further into the bay, to retreat; consequently, the houses on the spit were washed away due to beach erosion. Since then, fishing has not been as good.

Many Inuit and Dene people from the region frequently visited the place. The Athabascans regularly came here from the south and were involved in trading. The area around the trading post was, and still is today, a good fishing, hunting and camping site. Especially oldsquaws, caribous and polar bears were hunted at Demarcation Bay. Additionally, it occasionally serves as a stopover for people from Kaktovik taking boat trips to Canada to visit friends and relatives.

References

Unincorporated communities in North Slope Borough, Alaska
Populated places of the Arctic United States
Unincorporated communities in Alaska